Secret Lives of the Super Rich is an American television series hosted by Robert Frank airing on CNBC. The series explores how wealthy people live, what they buy and how they travel. It regularly features mansions, luxury cars and aircraft and expensive jewelry.

It premiered on September 25, 2013 running for eight half-hour episodes. A second six episode series premiered on January 22, 2014. A third season of just four episodes premiered on June 10, 2014. A fourth season of six episodes premiered on March 24, 2015. A fifth season premiered on March 30, 2016. A sixth season premiered on January 19, 2017.

Los Angeles-based real estate agent Aaron Kirman is featured regularly in the program.

Episodes

Season 1 (2013)

Season 2 (2014)

Season 3 (2014)

Season 4 (2015)

Season 5 (2016)

Season 6 (2017)

References

2010s American television news shows
2013 American television series debuts
2019 American television series endings
CNBC original programming
English-language television shows